Dosti: Friends Forever is a 2005 Indian romantic drama film directed by Suneel Darshan starring Akshay Kumar, Bobby Deol, Kareena Kapoor and Lara Dutta.  Juhi Chawla makes a special appearance.

Plot 
Karan Thapar (Bobby Deol) lives a wealthy yet very lonesome lifestyle with his business tycoon dad Vikram Thapar (Kiran Kumar), mom Kiran Thapar (Lillete Dubey), and sister Nandini Thapar (Karishma Tanna) as no one has time for him. One day while at the family's farmhouse, he loses his step and almost falls down a deep gorge. He is rescued by Raj Malhotra (Akshay Kumar), who is an orphan, living a poor lifestyle with his abusive maternal uncle. Karan and Raj become inseparable friends, and Raj moves in to live with Karan, much to the chagrin of the Thapar family members who dislike Raj.

Years later Raj and Karan are grown up; Raj is in love with his childhood sweetheart Anjali Saluja (Kareena Kapoor) and wants to marry her, while Karan flirts with Leena Bharucha (Sherlyn Chopra) and abandons her. Karan subsequently meets with London-returned Kajal Sharma (Lara Dutta) and woos her. She agrees to marry him. Raj's and Karan's weddings are planned for the same day. Things take a turn for the worse when Leena and her dad, who is employed by Thapar, characterize the friends as flirts. Consequently, Kajal breaks up with Karan and Anjali's brother cancels her wedding with Raj.

Raj, it is later revealed, is suffering from a fatal disorder. Aditi Walia (Juhi Chawla) is his doctor and the treatment is sponsored by Karan. Raj plays a pivotal role in helping Karan reunite with his family. Karan eventually marries Kajal. Karan and Kajal have named their child after Raj.

Cast
 Akshay Kumar as Raj Malhotra, Karan's best friend and Anjali's love interest, Fatal Disorder Disease Patient 
 Bobby Deol as Karan Thapar, Raj's best friend, Vikram and Kiran's son, Nandini's brother and Kajal's love interest
 Lara Dutta as Kajal Sharma, Karan's love interest
 Kareena Kapoor as Anjali Saluja, Raj's love interest
 Lillete Dubey as Kiran Thapar, Karan and Nandini's mother
 Juhi Chawla as Dr. Aditi Walia (special appearance)
 Kiran Kumar as Vikram Thapar, Karan and Nandini's father
 Sherlyn Chopra as Leena Bharucha
 Shakti Kapoor as Mr. Bharucha (Leena's father)
 Karishma Tanna as Nandini Thapar, Karan's sister
 Mahesh Thakur as Bhaskar Ahuja
 Navni Parihar as Anjali’s sister-in-law
 Aman Verma as Mr. Saluja (Anjali's husband)
 Dolly Bindra
 Mike Razowzky as Raj Malhotra's friend
 Kaneez Surka as Anjali's friend

Soundtrack
This was the last album of Nadeem-Shravan before they officially declared to split. The album was released in November 2005. The lyrics of all the songs were written by Sameer. The album was released in November 2005. The album was listed at No 7 position in the all-time music list of 2005. According to the Indian trade website Box Office India, with around 14,00,000 units sold, this film's soundtrack album was the year's eleventh highest-selling.

Track listing

Home Media
Even after Dostis box office success, as he had with his previous works, Darshan refused to sell the film's television rights. The collective value of his films' unsold satellite rights was estimated to be 150 crore. Darshan finally sold the rights to his films to Zee in 2017, and Dosti premiered on Zee Cinema on 23 September 2017, 12 years after its theatrical release. The film's premier garnered high ratings for the network.

References

External links
 
 

2005 films
2000s Hindi-language films
2005 romantic drama films
Indian buddy films
Indian romantic drama films
Films scored by Nadeem–Shravan
Films directed by Suneel Darshan